The Robertson-Yates House is a historic house on a former plantation in Hernando, Mississippi. It was built in 1850 for John Robertson, a settler, and his wife Susan. It was inherited by their daughter Annie Eliza Robertson, and her husband George Yates.

The house was designed in the Queen Anne architectural style, with Greek Revival features. It has been on the National Register of Historic Places since June 23, 2003.

References

Houses on the National Register of Historic Places in Mississippi
National Register of Historic Places in DeSoto County, Mississippi
Queen Anne architecture in Mississippi
Greek Revival architecture in Mississippi
Houses completed in 1850
Plantation houses in Mississippi